A fleet is a saline waterway within the North Kent Marshes in Kent, England, on the Hoo Peninsula between Rochester and Gravesend and on the Isle of Sheppey. It also has the meaning creek or inlet. The word comes from the Old English Flëot 798, Fletes 1086. They are a part of a nature reserve.

In the Cliffe Marshes the most prominent are the
 Cliffe Fleet
 Hope Fleet
 Salt Fleet
 Decoy Fleet

On Sheppey the most prominent is the
 Capel Fleet.

References

Landforms of Kent
Bodies of water of England